Centranthus amazonum is a species of plant in the family Caprifoliaceae. It is endemic to Italy.

Distribution

Its natural habitats are in Mediterranean shrubby vegetation and rocky areas.

Endangered
It is an IUCN Red List Critically Endangered plant species, threatened by habitat loss.

References

amazonum
Flora of Sardinia
Endemic flora of Italy
Critically endangered plants
Taxonomy articles created by Polbot
Plants described in 1998